Ezekiel Rahabi (1694–1771) was the chief Jewish merchant of the Dutch East India Company in Cochin, India for almost 50 years.
Rabbi Rahabi Ezekiel, (or Ezekiel Rahabi) also was a rabbinical writer known only through his polemical Hebrew translation of the New Testament - The Book of the Gospel Belonging to the Followers of Jesus  (c.1750).

The translation contains all the books of the New Testament and was translated between 1741 and 1756 by a certain Ezekiel Rahabi (not R'dkibi, pace Franz Delitzsch p.108) in "an uneven and faulty Hebrew with a strong anti-Christian bias." Oo 1:32 reads: "Heaven is my witness that I have not translated this, God forfend, to believe it, but to understand it and know how to answer the heretics . . . that our true Messiah will come. Amen." The 1756 edition appears to be the work of two different translators - a less educated Sephardi writer (Matthew-John), Ezekiel Rahabi himself, and a more educated German rabbi (Acts-Revelation) Leopold Immanuel Jacob van Dort.

References

Translators of the New Testament into Hebrew
18th-century rabbis
Jewish translators of the Bible
Cochin Jews
Indian rabbis
18th-century Indian translators
Critics of Christianity
Dutch East India Company people
1694 births
1771 deaths